Giuseppe Costanzo Buonfiglio (Messina, 1547 - Messina, 21 December 1622) was an Italian soldier and historian.

Biography
Born in Messina in 1545, or according to other sources in 1547, by Giovanni Artale, baron of Casale and Trisino, he was at the service of the Duke of Alba during military operations conducted in Flanders.

On his return to Sicily, he wrote the Sicilian Historia, published in Venice in 1604, imbued "with a municipal pride that almost always prevents him from having a serene vision of the past."

In 1721, Johann Lorenz von Mosheim translated into Latin and included in the Thesaurus antiquitatum et historiarum nobilissimarum insularum Siciliae (IX, coll. 1-120) by Johann Georg Graevius and Pieter Burman the work of Buonfiglio, with the title Messanae urbis nobilissimae descriptio, octo libris comprehensa.

Main works
 Dell'historia siciliana: nella quale si contiene la descrittione antica et moderna di Sicilia ... dalla sua origine per sino alla morte del catolico re don Filippo II, raccolta per Gioseppe Buonfiglio Costanzo, In Venetia: appresso Bonifacio Ciero ; then in Messina: nella stampa di Pietro Brea, 1604-1613.
 Messina città nobilissima, Venezia 1606.
 Anti apologia di Gioseppe Bonfiglio Costanzo caualier messinese. Contro gli apologisti, alleganti, e consulenti, e di qualunque altro nome nomar si possano. Contra la città di Messina; & suoi priuilegi, 1621.

Bibliography
 F. Natale, Avviamento allo studio del Medio Evo siciliano, Firenze 1959, pp. 67-70.
 Aa.Vv. Dizionario dei Siciliani illustri, Palermo 1939, p. 84, 156.

References 

17th-century Italian historians
People from Messina
1545 births
1622 deaths